Sir George Allanmore Ogarren Alleyne (born in St. Philip, Barbados, on 7 October 1932) served as United Nations Secretary-General's Special Envoy for HIV/AIDS in the Caribbean region 2003–2010. He was appointed to the position by UN Secretary-General Kofi Annan in February 2003.

Early life and education
George Allanmore Ogarren Alleyne was born in 1932 at Lucas street in St. Philip, Barbados, to a mother who was a homemaker and a father who was an elementary school teacher. He took his early education from Holy Trinity Boys school. He graduated from Harrison College in 1950 with the Barbados Scholarship in the Classics. He studied medicine and earned Bachelor of Medicine and Bachelor of Surgery at the University College of the West Indies and graduated as the gold medallist in 1957. He later earned
Doctor of Medicine from University of London in 1965. Later he pursued his postgraduate training in internal medicine in the United States.

Personal life 
He is married to Sylvan I. Chen and they have three children.

Career
In 1972, Alleyne became Professor of Medicine at UWI. In 1976, he was appointed Chairman of the Department of Medicine. In October 2003 he was appointed Chancellor of the University of West Indies.

Besides his academic experience, Alleyne also gained much experience in working for international organizations. In February 1995, he became Director of the Pan American Health Organization (PAHO), Regional Office of the World Health Organization (WHO). He served two four-year terms in this position until the end of January 2003 and was elected director emeritus. After his retirement, Alleyne was appointed by WHO Director-General Tedros Adhanom Ghebreyesus to serve on the Independent High-level Commission on Non-Communicable Diseases from 2018 until 2019.

Recognition
Alleyne was made a Knight Bachelor by Queen Elizabeth II in the 1990 New Year Honours, and awarded the Order of the Caribbean Community in 2001 - the highest honor that can be bestowed on a Caribbean national. In October 2008 he received the Science of Peace Award from the Inter American Heart Foundation. On June 14, 2017, he was awarded an honorary Doctorate of Science from the University of Toronto.

References

External links
Sir George Alleyne, Caribbean Community (CARICOM) website

1932 births
Living people
Barbadian academics
Alumni of University of London Worldwide
Alumni of the University of London
University of the West Indies alumni
University of the West Indies academics
World Health Organization officials
Barbadian officials of the United Nations
Caribbean public health doctors
HIV/AIDS in the Caribbean
Knights Bachelor
Recipients of the Order of the Caribbean Community
Members of the National Academy of Medicine